Carlo Röthlisberger (born 23 August 1994) is a Swiss ice dancer  who competes for Italy. With his skating partner, Victoria Manni, he is the 2016 Santa Claus Cup bronze medalist, a four-time Swiss national champion, and the 2023 Italian national silver medalist. They competed in the final segment at the 2020 European Championships.

Personal life 
Carlo Röthlisberger was born on 23 August 1994 in Sorengo, Switzerland. He studied geography at the University of Milan.

Career

Early years 
Röthlisberger began learning to skate in 1999. Early in his career, he represented Switzerland in men's singles. Coached by Sabrina Martin in Bellinzona, he made his ISU Junior Grand Prix (JGP) debut in September 2011, placing 19th in Riga, Latvia. He placed 14th in the preliminary round and 27th in the short program at the 2012 World Junior Championships in Minsk, Belarus.

In the 2013–14 season, he trained in both Bellinzona and Milan, coached by Cristina Mauri and Jean-Christophe Simond. He placed 28th in the short at the 2014 World Junior Championships in Sofia, Bulgaria.

In 2014, Röthlisberger teamed up with Valentina Schär to compete for Switzerland in ice dancing. Coached by Roberto Pelizzola in Milan, the two made their international debut at the 2014 NRW Trophy in November. In March, they placed 27th at the 2015 World Junior Championships in Tallinn, Estonia.

The following season, Schär/Röthlisberger were coached by Pelizzola, Barbara Riboldi, and Nicoletta Lunghi. They competed at a pair of JGP events but withdrew from the 2016 World Junior Championships before the start of the competition.

2016–2017 season: Debut of Manni/Röthlisberger 
In 2016, Röthlisberger teamed up with Italy's Victoria Manni to compete for Switzerland. They decided to train in Milan, coached by Roberto Pelizzola. Making their international debut, the duo placed 14th at the 2016 CS Tallinn Trophy in November. They placed 25th at the 2017 European Championships in Ostrava, Czech Republic.

2017–2018 season 
Manni/Röthlisberger finished 23rd at the 2018 European Championships in Moscow, Russia. Barbara Fusar-Poli, Stefano Caruso, and Pelizzola served as their coaches.

2018–2019 season 
Manni/Röthlisberger competed for the first time at both Europeans and Worlds but did not reach the free dance at either event. They ranked 24th in the short dance at the 2019 European Championships in Minsk, Belarus, and 23rd at the 2019 World Championships in Saitama, Japan. They finished ninth at the 2019 Winter Universiade in Krasnoyarsk, Russia. It was their final season training in Assago under Fusar-Poli, Caruso, and Pelizzola.

2019–2020 season 
Manni/Röthlisberger decided to train in Zürich, Switzerland, coached by Alexander Gazsi. At the 2020 European Championships in Graz (Austria), they qualified to the free dance and finished twentieth overall.

Programs

With Manni

With Schär

Men's singles

Competitive highlights 
CS: Challenger Series; JGP: Junior Grand Prix

Ice dancing with Manni for Italy

Ice dancing with Manni for Switzerland

Ice dancing with Schär

Men's singles

References

External links 

 

1994 births
Living people
People from Lugano District
Swiss male ice dancers
Swiss male single skaters
Competitors at the 2019 Winter Universiade